Al Mahwait District is a district of the Al Mahwit Governorate, Yemen. As of 2003, the district had a population of 50,526 inhabitants.

References

Districts of Al Mahwit Governorate